The 2007 Helvetia Cup or 2007 European B Team Championships in badminton was held from January 17 to January 21 in Reykjavík, Iceland.

The three better teams of the competition won promotion to the top group.

Venue
Laugardalur Sports Centre

Group stages

Group 1

Group 2

Group 3

Group 4

Knockout stages

Top four

Final classification table

External links
Official website
TournamentSoftware.com: European B Team Championships 2007

References

Helvetia Cup
Helvetia Cup
Helvetia Cup
B
Sports competitions in Reykjavík
Badminton tournaments in Iceland
2000s in Reykjavík
January 2007 sports events in Europe